Lady's Choice is a 1953 West German comedy film directed by E. W. Emo and starring Georg Thomalla, Grethe Weiser, and Willy Fritsch. The title is a traditional German dancing term for a dance where the female gets to choose their male partners.

It was shot at the Spandau Studios in Berlin. The film's sets were designed by the art director Rolf Zehetbauer.

Cast

References

External links

1953 comedy films
German comedy films
West German films
Films directed by E. W. Emo
Gloria Film films
Films shot at Spandau Studios
1950s German films